is a Japanese rugby union player who plays as a lock or flanker. He currently plays for Tokyo Sungoliath in Japan's domestic Japan Rugby League One. He was signed to the Sunwolves squad for the 2020 Super Rugby season, but did not make an appearance for the side.

References

1998 births
Living people
Japanese rugby union players
Rugby union locks
Rugby union flankers
Sunwolves players
Tokyo Sungoliath players
21st-century Japanese people